The Mountain Rat is a 1914 silent four-reel film directed by James Kirkwood for Biograph. The film—described as "a drama of daring and romance in the Western wilds"—is notable for being one of the biggest early screen appearances of actress Dorothy Gish.

Plot 
After an argument, Douglas Williams' fiancee, Harriet, returns the engagement ring. Discouraged, he soon heads out west, where he meets and falls for a dancer named Nell, known as the Mountain Rat in a dance hall at a mining camp. Nell has been shunned by the more "respectable" women of the community, but Douglas doesn't care; he marries her on the spur of the moment. Drama ensues when Douglas's mother and former fiancee come looking for him and he's forced to choose.

Cast 

 Henry B. Walthall as Douglas Williams
 Irene Hunt as Harriet
 Dorothy Gish as Nell, the Mountain Rat
 Donald Crisp as Steve
 Josephine Crowell as Mrs. Williams

References 

1914 films
American black-and-white films
Films directed by James Kirkwood Sr.